The 2012 Aegon International was a combined men's and women's tennis tournament played on outdoor grass courts. It was the 38th edition of the event for the women and the 4th edition for the men. It was classified as a WTA Premier tournament on the 2012 WTA Tour and as an ATP World Tour 250 series on the 2012 ATP World Tour. The event took place at the Devonshire Park Lawn Tennis Club in Eastbourne, United Kingdom from 16 June through 23 June 2012. Andy Roddick and Tamira Paszek won the singles titles.

ATP singles main draw entrants

Seeds

 1 Seedings are based on the rankings as of 11 June 2012

Other entrants
The following players received wildcards into the main draw:
  Jamie Baker
  Andy Roddick
  James Ward

The following players received a special exempt into the main draw:
  Sam Querrey

The following players qualified for the main draw:
  Matthew Ebden 
  Paul-Henri Mathieu
  Marinko Matosevic
  Vasek Pospisil

Retirements
  Steve Darcis (back injury)
  Philipp Kohlschreiber (ankle injury)
  Sam Querrey (back injury)

ATP doubles main draw entrants

Seeds

 Rankings are as of 11 June 2012

Other entrants
The following pairs received wildcards into the doubles main draw:
  Jamie Delgado /  Ken Skupski
  Dominic Inglot /  Jonathan Marray

WTA singles main draw entrants

Seeds

 1 Seedings are based on the rankings as of 11 June 2012

Other entrants
The following players received wildcards into the main draw:
  Anne Keothavong
  Heather Watson

The following player qualified for the main draw:
  Gréta Arn
  Stéphanie Dubois
  Laura Robson
  Elena Vesnina

The following player received entry as lucky loser:
  Andrea Hlaváčková

Withdrawals
  Ana Ivanovic (right hip injury)
  Kaia Kanepi (heels) 
  Peng Shuai
  Vera Zvonareva

Retirements
  Hsieh Su-wei (low back injury)

WTA doubles main draw entrants

Seeds

1 Rankings are as of 11 June 2012

Retirements
  Elena Baltacha (neck injury)
  Liezel Huber (right thigh injury)
  Paola Suárez (lumbar spine injury)
  Hsieh Su-wei (low back injury)

Finals

Men's singles

 Andy Roddick defeated  Andreas Seppi, 6–3, 6–2

Women's singles

 Tamira Paszek defeated  Angelique Kerber, 5–7, 6–3, 7–5

Men's doubles

 Colin Fleming /  Ross Hutchins defeated  Jamie Delgado /  Ken Skupski, 6–4, 6–3

Women's doubles

 Nuria Llagostera Vives /  María José Martínez Sánchez defeated  Liezel Huber /  Lisa Raymond, 6–4, ret.

References

External links
 www.aegoninternational.com

2012 WTA Tour
2012 ATP World Tour
2012
2012 in English tennis
June 2012 sports events in the United Kingdom